Over the Bar: A Personal Relationship with the GAA is a memoir by the Irish writer Breandán Ó hEithir, describing his early life on Inishmore, his education at University College, Galway (where he subsequently dropped out) and his long-time involvement with the Gaelic Athletic Association.

References

Irish autobiographies
Sports autobiographies
1991 non-fiction books